Greatest Works of Art is the fifteenth studio album by Taiwanese singer Jay Chou, released on 15 July 2022 through JVR Music. It is Chou's first album since his fourteenth studio album Jay Chou's Bedtime Stories and was preceded by five singles released from 2018 to 2022—"Waiting for You" with Gary Yang, "If You Don't Love Me, It's Fine", "Won't Cry" with Mayday vocalist Ashin, "Mojito" and the title track. The song "I Truly Believe" was released in 2019 as the theme for the 2019 Chinese action film Skyfire. The title track and "Still Wandering" also had music videos shot for them, which were released in July 2022.

Background
The album, named for its title track, is an homage to modern European art and culture; Chou himself is an avid art collector. Prior to its release, Chou said the material would be "old sounds recorded with vintage instruments".

Greatest Works of Art attracted attention due to users leaving low ratings for the album on Douban prior to its release, which Douban later removed and apologised for allowing in a post on Weibo.

Promotion
Chou first  released the album in June 2022 in a vlog filmed in Paris, where he also shot the music video for the title track. The album was promoted on Spotify billboards in New York City, Toronto and Taiwan, with Chou also releasing a track-by-track commentary edition of the album on Spotify.

Commercial performance
The album became Chou's first album to chart in Australia, debuting at number 29 on the chart dated 25 July 2022.

Track listing

Charts

References

2022 albums
Jay Chou albums